Krystyna Karwowska (1931-2018) was a Polish professor of agricultural science. She worked in the Warsaw University of Life Sciences. Her interests include horticulture and medicinal herbs.

Awards
Gold Cross of Merit (Poland)
Knight of the Order of Polonia Restituta

References

1931 births
2018 deaths
20th-century Polish scientists
Polish women scientists
Polish agronomists
Recipients of the Gold Cross of Merit (Poland)
Knights of the Order of Polonia Restituta
20th-century Polish women